Jens Steffensen (born 4 August 1950) is a former Danish football player.

During his club career, Steffensen played for Aalborg BK, Bayer Uerdingen, Arminia Bielefeld, Ikast FS, Hjørring IF and Herfølge Boldklub.

Steffensen made 9 appearances for the Denmark national football team from 1976 to 1980, scoring 1 goal.

External links

1950 births
Danish men's footballers
Denmark international footballers
AaB Fodbold players
KFC Uerdingen 05 players
Arminia Bielefeld players
Ikast FS players
Vendsyssel FF players
Herfølge Boldklub players
Association football defenders
Living people